Saskatchewan Hospital North Battleford (SHNB) is a public psychiatric hospital in North Battleford, Saskatchewan. It is owned by the Government of Saskatchewan and operated by the Saskatchewan Health Authority. The facility has 284 beds in total, including a 96-bed secure unit for offenders with mental health needs. The new facility includes a number of modernizations to improve patient care, including:

 32 more beds (an increase from 156 to 188),
 A "home-like" rather than institutional atmosphere,
 Scenic placement on the North Saskatchewan River with maximized views of nature from inside, and
 A cogeneration system to reduce its environmental footprint.

The project was announced in 2011 and began construction in September 2015. It held its grand opening March 14, 2019.

The Government of Saskatchewan committed $407 million to the project, which covers design, construction, and 30 years of maintenance.  Of this, approximately $222 million is attributable to construction. The project is proceeding as a public-private partnership (P3). Financial analysis by Ernst & Young indicated a P3 would save $90 million (18%) over the life of the project, versus a typical government-led project.  Design, construction, and maintenance are the responsibility of a group named Access Prairies Partnership, led by Graham. The construction effort created more than 1,500 jobs in the province.

Original hospital 

Built between 1911 and 1913, the facility in North Battleford was the first mental health hospital to be built in Saskatchewan, Canada.  It had 156 beds.  Prior to its establishment, patients were sent to hospitals in Manitoba.  The first superintendent of the hospital was James Walter MacNeill.  The number of patients peaked at over 4,000 in 1946; with the advent of community care throughout the province the number of patients in the facility had dropped to under 300 by 1980.

The original hospital is located at 1 Jersey Street in the North Battleford Crown Colony, a census subdivision adjacent to the City of North Battleford. The fate of the old facility is, as yet, unknown.  The Government of Saskatchewan is accepting proposals for its future over summer 2019 and will make a decision thereafter.

References

External links
Prairie North Health Region – Saskatchewan Hospital 

Hospital buildings completed in 1913
Hospitals in Saskatchewan
Hospitals established in 1913
Psychiatric hospitals in Canada
North Battleford
1913 establishments in Saskatchewan